1246 Chaka, provisional designation , is a background asteroid from the central regions of the asteroid belt, approximately  in diameter. It was discovered on 23 July 1932, by South African astronomer Cyril Jackson at the Union Observatory in Johannesburg. The uncommon A/Sl-type asteroid has a longer than average rotation period of 25.5 hours. It was named for the Zulu King Shaka.

Orbit and classification 

Chaka is a non-family asteroid from the main belt's background population. It orbits the Sun in the central asteroid belt at a distance of 1.8–3.4 AU once every 4 years and 3 months (1,549 days; semi-major axis of 2.62 AU). Its orbit has an eccentricity of 0.31 and an inclination of 16° with respect to the ecliptic. The body's observation arc begins with its first observation at Johannesburg on 4 July 1932, three weeks prior to its official discovery observation.

Naming 

This minor planet was named after Shaka (c.1787–1828), also Chaka or Tchaka, founder and one of the most influential monarchs of the Zulu Kingdom. The official  was mentioned in The Names of the Minor Planets by Paul Herget in 1955.

Physical characteristics 

Chaka spectral type has been determined during the Small Solar System Objects Spectroscopic Survey (S3OS2). In the Tholen-like taxonomic variant of the survey, the asteroid is a rare A-type, while in the SMASS-like variant it is a Sl-subtype, that transitions between the common S- and uncommon L-type asteroids.

Rotation period 

In October 2013, a rotational lightcurve of Chaka was obtained from photometric observations by Joe Garlitz at his Elgin Observatory. Lightcurve analysis gave a well-defined rotation period of  hours with a brightness amplitude of 0.18 magnitude. Other period determinations were made by European astronomers (20 h; Δ0.2) at OHP and La Silla in October 1996, and by Andrea Ferrero (25.44 h; Δ0.25) at the Italian Bigmuskie Observatory  in November 2013.

Diameter and albedo 

According to the surveys carried out by the Infrared Astronomical Satellite IRAS and the NEOWISE mission of NASA's Wide-field Infrared Survey Explorer, Chaka measures between 17.63 and 20.84 kilometers in diameter and its surface has an albedo between 0.195 and 0.310. The Collaborative Asteroid Lightcurve Link adopts the results obtained by IRAS, that is, an albedo of 0.2351 and a diameter of 18.11 kilometers based on an absolute magnitude of 10.9.

Notes

References

External links 
 Elgin Observatory, Backyard Amateur Astromomy
 Asteroid Lightcurve Database (LCDB), query form (info )
 Dictionary of Minor Planet Names, Google books
 Discovery Circumstances: Numbered Minor Planets (1)-(5000) – Minor Planet Center
 
 

001246
Discoveries by Cyril Jackson (astronomer)
Named minor planets
19320723